The list of shipwrecks in November 1918 includes ships sunk, foundered, grounded, or otherwise lost during November 1918.

1 November

2 November

3 November

4 November

5 November

6 November

7 November

9 November

10 November

11 November

12 November

13 November

14 November

15 November

16 November

18 November

20 November

21 November

22 November

24 November

26 November

27 November

Unknown date

References

1918-11
 11